Daud is a male Arabic given name and surname corresponding to David. The Persian form is Davud or Davoud. Other variant spellings in the Latin alphabet include Da'ud, Daut, Daoud, Dawud, Dawood, Davood, Daood and Davut.

People with this given name
Dawood ( 1043 BC - 937 BC?), The king David of Israel in Islam, considered to be a Prophet and Messenger of Allah.
Daud Abdullah (born 1955), Grenadian-British researcher and scholar
Daud Khan Achakzai, Pakistani politician 
Daud Ali (born 1964), American historian
Dawda Bah (born 1983), Gambian association footballer
Daud Beureu'eh (1899–1987), Acehnese military leader
Daud Bolad (died 1992), Sudanese politician and rebel leader
Daouda Compaoré (born 1973), Burkinabé association football player
Daud Haider (born 1952), Bangladeshi poet
Daoud Hanania (born 1934), Jordanian heart surgeon and politician
Daud Abdulle Hirsi (1925–1965), Somali military leader
Daud Ibrahim (1947–2010), Malaysian cyclist
Dawood Ibrahim (born 1955), Indian organised crime leader
Daouda Jabi (born 1981), Guinean association footballer
Dawda Jawara (born 1924), Gambian statesman, prime minister and later president
Daud Junbish, Afghan journalist
Dawud of Kanem, 14th-century Kanem leader
Daud Kamal (1935–1987), Pakistani English literature professor
Dauda Kamara, Sierra Leonean politician
Daud Khan Karrani (died 1576), Bengali military leader
David XI of Kartli (died  1579), King of Kartli
Mohammed Daoud Khan (1909–1978), Afghan statesman, prime minister and later president
Daud Khan (cricketer) (1912–1979), Pakistani cricket player and umpire
Daud Ali Khan (died 1883), Nawab of Masulipatam in India
Daud Abdihakim Omar, Somali politician and government minister
Daud Mohamed Omar, Somali politician and government minister
Daud Khan Panni (died 1715), Mughul commander and later Nawab of the Carnatic region of south India
Daud Bandagi Kirmani, 16th-century Indian saint
Daud Mirza (1969–2014), Pakistani-Norwegian actor
Dawud M. Mu'Min (1953–1997), American convicted murderer
Daud Rahbar (1926–2013), Pakistani-American writer, musicologist, and scholar 
Daoud Soumain (died 2008), Chadian military leader
Daoud Mustafa Khalid (1917-2008), Sudanese neurologist.
Daud Khan Undiladze, 17th century Iranian military commander and politician
Daouda Malam Wanké ( 1950–2004), Nigerien military and political leader
Dawud Wharnsby (born 1972), Canadian singer-songwriter
David Alvian Syampranata (born 1989) descendant king of Banyuwangi Indonesia

People with this surname
Indanan Kasim Daud, Filipino politician
J. B. Dauda (born 1942), Sierra Leonean politician and government minister
Darni M Daud (born 1961), Indonesian university administrator
Kamilou Daouda (born 1987), Nigerien footballer
Muhammed Dawood (disambiguation), several people
N. J. Dawood (1927–2014), Iraqi translator
Parviz Davoodi (born 1952), Iranian politician
Siraj Mehfuz Daud (1931–2010), Indian judge
Sulaiman Daud (1933–2010), Malaysian politician and government minister
Zulekha Daud, Indian hospital administrator

Arabic masculine given names
Bosniak masculine given names
Turkish masculine given names